Texas's 26th congressional district of the United States House of Representatives includes rural Cooke County to the north and some of Wise County to the West and includes parts of Denton County, including Flower Mound, Lewisville and parts of Corinth, Carrollton, Little Elm and The Colony. The current Representative is Michael C. Burgess.  The district is best known as the seat of former House Majority Leader Dick Armey.

History
The district was created as a result of the redistricting cycle after the 1980 Census, due to the population growth in Texas and Denton County, specifically in its southern sector. Since its creation, the district has been based in Denton County, one of Texas's fastest-growing counties.

Democrat Tom Vandergriff was the first person to represent the district, winning in 1982. Vandergriff narrowly lost to Republican Dick Armey in 1984, and the seat has continuously been held by Republicans ever since. Indeed, since Vandergriff's defeat in 1984, no Democrat has crossed the 40 percent mark. As Denton County has become overwhelmingly Republican in recent years (all but one county officeholder is Republican, as is all but one member of the Texas Legislature representing the county), the 26th district is considered a "safe seat" for the GOP.

Since the 2010 redistricting, the 26th district has included most of Denton County (except the southeast portion) and a portion of north central Tarrant County.

However, the district has been trending Democratic in recent years. Donald Trump carried it by 14 points in 2020, while Mitt Romney had carried it by 37 in 2012.

After the 2020 Census, rapid growth resulted in significant changes in the composition of the district. For the first time since the district's creation, the City of Denton, the county seat of Denton County, will not be a part of the district. It was instead shifted to the Panhandle-based 13th district. The 26th also lost its small share of Frisco. To make up for the loss of population, portions of Wise County and all of Cooke County will become part of the district. Lewisville will become the largest city in the district. 

Denton had become increasingly friendly to Democrats in recent years, and voting trends suggested that under the previous map, the 26th could have potentially become competitive. The redrawn 26th, on the other hand, is considered slightly more Republican than its predecessor.

Election results from presidential races

List of members representing the district

Recent election results

2004 election

2006 election

2008 election

2010 election

2016 election

2018 election

2020 election

Historical district boundaries

See also
List of United States congressional districts

References

 Congressional Biographical Directory of the United States 1774–present

26
Denton County, Texas
Cooke County, Texas
Tarrant County, Texas